The 2020 Colorado Buffaloes football team represented the University of Colorado Boulder during the 2020 NCAA Division I FBS football season. The Buffaloes were led by first-year lead coach Karl Dorrell and played their home games on campus at Folsom Field as a member of the South Division of the Pac-12 Conference.

On August 11, 2020, the Pac-12 Conference suspended all fall sports competitions due to the COVID-19 pandemic. On September 3, the Pac-12 announced a resumption of the 2020 football season featuring a seven-game conference-only schedule, starting on November 7 and ending with the Pac-12 Championship game on December 18.

Previous season

The Buffaloes finished the 2019 season 5–7 and 3–6 in Pac-12 play to finish in fifth place in the South Division.

Coaching staff

Schedule
Colorado had games scheduled against Colorado State, Fresno State and Texas A&M. These games were canceled on July 10, due to the Pac-12 Conference's decision to play a conference-only schedule due to the COVID-19 pandemic.

Awards and honors

Weekly awards

End of year awards

Individual
 Jarek Broussard - Pac-12 Offensive Player of the Year
 Karl Dorrell - Pac-12 Coach of the Year
 Brenden Rice - Pac-12 Freshman Offensive Player of the Year Honorable Mention
 Christian Gonzalez - Pac-12 Defensive Player of the Year Honorable Mention

All-Pac-12 Team
1st Team

 Jarek Broussard (RB)
 Nate Landman (LB)

2nd Team
 Sam Noyer (QB)
 William Sherman (OL)
 Mustafa Johnson (DL)
 Jaylen Jackson (ST)

Honorable Mention
 Frank Fillip (OL)
 Terrance Lang (DL) 
 Isaiah Lewis (DB)
 Casey Roddick (OL)
 Dimitri Stanley (WR) 
 Carson Wells (LB)

Players drafted into the NFL

References

Colorado
Colorado Buffaloes football seasons
Colorado Buffaloes football